The 2014–15 Georgia Southern Eagles men's basketball team represented Georgia Southern University during the 2014–15 NCAA Division I men's basketball season. The Eagles, led by second year head coach Mark Byington, played their home games at Hanner Fieldhouse and were first year members of the Sun Belt Conference. They finished the season 22–9, 14–6 in Sun Belt play to finish in a tie for second place. They advanced to the championship game of the Sun Belt tournament where they lost to Georgia State. Despite having 22 wins, they did not participate in a postseason tournament.

Roster

Schedule

|-
!colspan=9 style="background:#000080; color:#FFFFFF;"| Exhibition

|-
!colspan=9 style="background:#000080; color:#FFFFFF;"| Regular season

|-
!colspan=9 style="background:#000080; color:#FFFFFF;"| Sun Belt tournament

References

Georgia Southern Eagles men's basketball seasons
Georgia Southern